GEJ may refer to:
 Gen language
 Gimnasia y Esgrima de Jujuy, an Argentine sports club
 Goodluck Jonathan (born 1957), former President of Nigeria
 Jérôme Rota (born 1973), French software developer